"Gingo biloba" (later: "Ginkgo biloba") is a poem written by the German poet Johann Wolfgang von Goethe. The poem was published in his work West–östlicher Divan (West–Eastern Divan), first published in 1819. Goethe used "Gingo" instead of "Ginkgo" in the first version to avoid the hard sound of the letter "k".

Goethe sent Marianne von Willemer (1784–1860), the wife of the Frankfurt banker Johann Jakob von Willemer (1760–1838), a ginkgo leaf as a symbol of friendship and on September 15, 1815, he read his draft of the poem to her and friends. On September 23, 1815, he saw Marianne for the last time. Then he showed her the Ginkgo tree in the garden of Heidelberg Castle from which he took the two leaves pasted onto the poem. After that he wrote the poem and sent it to Marianne on September 27, 1815. Directly across from the Ginkgo tree stands the Goethe memorial tablet. The poem was published later in the "Book of Suleika" in West–östlicher Diwan.

The letter containing this poem with which Goethe included two Ginkgo leaves with two distinct lobes can be viewed in the Goethe Museum in Düsseldorf. The Ginkgo (planted in 1795) that Goethe led Marianne von Willemer to in September 1815 is no longer standing today. After 1928 the Ginkgo tree in the castle garden was labelled as "the same tree that inspired Goethe to create his fine poem". The tree was probably still standing in 1936. A  is located in Weimar.

References 

Poetry by Johann Wolfgang von Goethe
1819 poems